Karl B. Allen (born October 13, 1960) is a Democratic member of the South Carolina Senate, representing the 7th District since 2012. He is an attorney.

References

1960 births
Living people
African-American state legislators in South Carolina
Democratic Party South Carolina state senators
21st-century American politicians
21st-century African-American politicians
20th-century African-American people